Jan Kysela (born 17 December 1985) is a Czech football player who played for most of his career for Mladá Boleslav. He currently plays in lower Czech divisions.

References

Czech footballers
Czech Republic under-21 international footballers
1985 births
Living people
Czech First League players
FK Mladá Boleslav players
SK Slavia Prague players
Association football forwards
Sportspeople from Mladá Boleslav
FK Ústí nad Labem players